Suliszów may refer to the following places:
Suliszów, Opole Voivodeship (south-west Poland)
Suliszów, Kielce County in Świętokrzyskie Voivodeship (south-central Poland)
Suliszów, Sandomierz County in Świętokrzyskie Voivodeship (south-central Poland)